Sammy Swings is the fourth studio album by Sammy Davis Jr., released in 1957.

Track listing
 "Temptation" (Nacio Herb Brown, Arthur Freed) - 2:56
 "The Lady's in Love with You" (Burton Lane, Frank Loesser) - 2:39
 "Comes Love" (Sam H. Stept) - 2:45
 "Don't Get Around Much Anymore" (Duke Ellington, Bob Russell) - 3:27
 "That Old Black Magic" (Harold Arlen, Johnny Mercer) - 2:37
 "Oo-Shoo-Be-Doo-Be" (Dizzy Gillespie, Joe Carroll, Bill Graham) - 2:44
 "Begin the Beguine" (Cole Porter) - 3:24
 "By Myself (Arthur Schwartz, Howard Dietz) - 2:57
 "The Gypsy in My Soul" (Clay Boland, Moe Jaffe) - 2:57
 "Will You Still Be Mine" (Tom Adair, Matt Dennis) - 2:57
 "Don'cha Go 'Way Mad" (Illinois Jacquet, Jimmy Mundy, Al Stillman) - 2:45
 "Perdido (Lost)" (Juan Tizol, Ervin Drake, Hans Lengsfelder) - 2:31

Personnel
Sammy Davis Jr. - vocals

References

Decca Records albums
Sammy Davis Jr. albums
1957 albums